Zagrad is a settlement north of Svibno in the Municipality of Radeče in eastern Slovenia. The area is part of the historical region of Lower Carniola. The municipality is now included in the Lower Sava Statistical Region; until January 2014 it was part of the Savinja Statistical Region.

References

External links
Zagrad at Geopedia

Populated places in the Municipality of Radeče